Johann Manlius was an early modern era typographer who ran a printing house that served small towns in  Habsburg Hungary. Also a woodcutter, he moved to Hungary in 1582.

References

Sources

Further reading
 A. Jembrih, Ivan Manlius prvi tiskar Varaždina (1586 - 1587)

1605 deaths
16th-century printers
16th-century Hungarian people